Edgars may refer to:

 Edgars, New Jersey, United States
 Edgars, Ontario, Canada
 The Edgar Awards for mystery fiction
 Edgars (department store), a department store chain in South Africa owned by Edcon Limited
 Edgar Department Stores, a defunct department store chain in New England
 Edgars (name), people with the name

See also
 Edgar (disambiguation)